Otto IV (January 3, 1307 –  December 14, 1334 in Munich) was a Duke of Lower Bavaria.

Family

He was a son of Stephen I, Duke of Bavaria and Jutta of Schweidnitz.

His maternal grandparents were Bolko I, Duke of Jawor and Świdnica and Beatrix of Brandenburg.

Bolko was a son of Bolesław II the Bald and his first wife Hedwig of Anhalt. Beatrix was a daughter of Otto V, Margrave of Brandenburg-Salzwedel and Jutta of Hennenberg.

Reign

He succeeded as Duke of Lower Bavaria from 1310 until 1334 as co-regent of his brother Henry XIV and his cousin Henry XV. In 1322 he was in war with his co-regents, in 1331 Lower Bavaria was finally partitioned among them. Otto then governed Burghausen, Traunstein and several other Bavarian cities. Otto, who hated his brother made his cousin Emperor Louis IV, Holy Roman Emperor his contracted heir.

Marriage

Otto IV married Richardis of Jülich. She was a daughter of Gerhard V of Jülich and Elisabeth of Brabant-Aarschot. They had one known child:

Albert of Wittelsbach. Born in 1332. Predeceased his father.

External links

Otto IV, Duke of Bavaria
Otto IV, Duke of Bavaria
14th-century dukes of Bavaria
Otto IV, Duke of Bavaria
Medieval child monarchs